Błotniak (Polish for "Harrier") is a one-man wet cabin underwater craft designed in Poland in 1978. It was based in the torpedo research centre in Gdynia (commonly called Formoza).

Technical data

Specification
propulsion:
two batteries of compressed air accumulators in the tubes on the sides of the craft
one set of ducted contra-rotating propellers
one electrical motor as a source of power for the propeller
equipment:
two spotlights
2 sonars (passive and active)
depth-levelling system
maximum speed: 
range: 
load capacity:

See also

Submarines of Poland
Polish Navy